Arnór Sigurðsson (born 15 May 1999) is an Icelandic professional footballer who plays as an attacking midfielder for Swedish club IFK Norrköping on loan from the Russian club PFC CSKA Moscow. He represents the Iceland national team.

Club career

IFK Norrköping
Arnór was described as a key player for Norrköping in the 2018 Allsvenskan season, where he played as an attacking midfielder.

CSKA Moscow
On 31 August 2018, Arnór signed a 5-year contract with the Russian Premier League club PFC CSKA Moscow. The transfer fee was reportedly set at around 40 million Swedish kronor (approximately €4 million), a club record fee received by IFK Norrköping. Arnór made his debut for CSKA on 19 September 2018 in a game against FC Viktoria Plzeň and became the youngest Icelandic player ever to appear in a UEFA Champions League game. He scored his first goal for CSKA on 7 November 2018 in a Champions League game against Roma. Four days later, he scored his first Russian Premier League goal in a 2–0 victory over FC Zenit Saint Petersburg. On 12 December 2018, Sigurðsson scored a goal in a 3–0 win over Real Madrid in the Santiago Bernabéu Stadium. On 6 April 2019, he scored twice in a 2–0 derby victory over FC Spartak Moscow.

Loan to Venezia
On 30 July 2021, he joined Italian Serie A club Venezia on loan for the 2021–22 season. Before going on loan, he extended his contract with CSKA until 2024.

Return to IFK Norrköping
On 3 July 2022, Sigurðsson suspended his contract with CSKA Moscow for the 2022–23 season, having taken advantage of the FIFA ruling relating to the Russian invasion of Ukraine. On 14 July 2022, he returned to IFK Norrköping until June 2023 under these regulations.

International career
Arnór made his senior debut for Iceland on 15 November 2018 in a 2018–19 UEFA Nations League A game against Belgium, as a starter.

Career statistics

Club

International

Scores and results list Iceland's goal tally first, score column indicates score after each Arnór goal.

References

External links

Sigurdsson, Arnor
Sigurdsson, Arnor
Icelandic footballers
Iceland youth international footballers
Iceland under-21 international footballers
Iceland international footballers
People from Akranes
Úrvalsdeild karla (football) players
Sigurdsson, Arnor
Sigurdsson, Arnor
Sigurdsson, Arnor
Sigurdsson, Arnor
Sigurdsson, Arnor
Sigurdsson, Arnor
Sigurdsson, Arnor
Sigurdsson, Arnor
Sigurdsson, Arnor
Icelandic expatriate footballers
Icelandic expatriate sportspeople in Sweden
Icelandic expatriate sportspeople in Russia
Icelandic expatriate sportspeople in Italy